Camp Rising Sun  is an international, full-scholarship, leadership summer program for students aged 14–16 by the Louis August Jonas Foundation (LAJF), a non-profit organization. Participants come from all over the world and are chosen by merit. Instead of being asked to pay for tuition, campers are requested to pass along, to someone else, the benefits they gained.

There are alumni organizations in numerous countries with more than 5,000 alumni around the world. Among the Camp Rising Sun alumni are a United Nations Under-Secretary General; a president of Harvard University; a winner of the Intel Science Talent Search; a Foreign Minister of South Korea; two former Israeli ambassadors; an Under Secretary of State in the Carter administration; and folk singer Pete Seeger.

In 1996, a group of Danish and other European alumni founded Camp Rising Sun Europe for young women. Organized and maintained by the George E. Jonas Foundation and the Camp Rising Sun Alumni Association of Denmark, the program was located in Stendis, Region Midtjylland, Denmark.

Background 
It was founded just after the stock market crash in 1929 by philanthropist George E. Jonas with the mission to "develop in promising young people from diverse backgrounds a lifelong commitment to sensitive and responsible leadership for the betterment of their communities and world."

The son of a successful businessman, Jonas grew up in privilege and wealth, but was troubled about the advantages he had in comparison with others. He grew dismayed at the world. Pondering what he could do to bring a measure of stability and peace to the world, he reasoned that hope rested in the youth of the world and he began to consider what might encourage, stimulate and motivate them. He got the idea to start a camp, one that "is interested not merely in the boy, but in the man the boy will become." He set up a foundation, naming it after his father; the foundation runs the camp. For decades, Jonas personally interviewed many prospective campers and he was fondly called by all by his nickname, "Freddie."

After World War II, the program  was expanded to include youth from every region of the world. In 1947, the first two African American boys were invited to attend and 1989, a girls' program was established. Jonas remained closely associated with the program until the time of his death in 1978.

Goals 

The Louis August Jonas Foundation is guided by the philosophy of the founder. The mission is to "develop in promising young people from diverse backgrounds a lifelong commitment to sensitive and responsible leadership for the betterment of their communities and world." In following Jonas' mission, the camp nurtures leadership skills and the training that comes with practical experience.  Each camper gets the chance to be camp leader for one day. Prior to the 2018 Boys’ Session, the camper in charge for that day was called the sachem—a word that refers to an Algonquian chief. However, in 2018, the campers decided that this word was unjustly stolen from Native American culture. Thus, they ended the use of the word. As of 2018, the camper(s) in charge for the day are called “Leader(s) of the Day”. Feedback, both from the staff and peers, is given to further gain from the experience. Staff members, typically graduate students or teachers, provide support.

The goal of the program is that participants would integrate what they learn at Camp Rising Sun into their lives and pass it along to others. After the two months of sharing and working together, Jonas wanted campers to return to their communities the benefits they had gained. He said, "We ask that the boys return to life, some day and in some way, the good they have received from it. So, we do ask a price, and its a rather high one."

International community 
The roughly 60 participants each year are students from more than 30 countries who are invited to attend the camp. Most come for just one summer, but each season includes a handful of students who are invited back for a second summer to help carry on the camp's traditions from year to year. Campers from outside the United States had an opportunity to stay with an American family or with US campers or alumni as part of a hosting program before the camp season starts.

The selection of participants is highly competitive and is based on a candidate's potential leadership ability, intellect (demonstrated academic achievement and ability to think critically), character, and individuality (developed abilities and interests). Camp alumni are generally responsible for selecting new campers from their countries, but in some cases, government officials such as the Minister of Education or an ambassador, do the selecting.

The program is neither religious nor political, but with campers coming from all over the United States, Europe, Asia, Africa and elsewhere, politics and religion are just two of the many topics that come up for discussion. After two months of exposure to many other nationalities, international issues become personal concerns. One camper after her summer at CRS stated, "It's not just Iran anymore. It's my friend, Sepideh, who lives in Iran," referring to how such an international issue became personal to her.

Camp Rising Sun's reputation was built on the conviction that there is much to be learned through experience and interaction with those from other cultures and nations. Campers help with all aspects of the camp, including meal preparation and maintenance, and work together on intellectual or cultural projects of their own choosing. They also conceive of and carry out landscaping projects to improve the camp, such as building a Finnish sauna or a Japanese rock garden. The eight weeks at CRS became a life-transforming experience.  Alumni often choose professions of service and stay involved with the camp for decades afterward.

Camp activities
Jonas said, "Schools give you technical training, but they don't necessarily teach you how to think" and set up his camp to supply that need. Thus, while CRS includes swimming, boating, hiking, ping pong, soccer, basketball, tennis, and other sports, its focus is on providing opportunities for intellectual growth, for development of leadership skills, and appreciation of the value of diversity. The program challenges campers to try new things, but also offers them the option of participating or not, a freedom some have never experienced before. Campers work together in peer-led teams to take care of the daily maintenance needs of the camp. Counselors are skilled in a variety of disciplines from lifesaving to Japanese wrestling to filmmaking. There is instruction by staff, visiting alumni, guests, or other students on subjects like international affairs, poetry, theater, microscopes, filmmaking, creative writing, landscaping, history, music, art, drama, philosophy, ethics, and nature. Three weekly newspapers, written and produced by campers, document the comedic, artistic, and overall progress of the camp.

Students work on projects they conceive, plan and manage, both individually and in peer-led groups. There are evening artistic and intellectual programs, most often planned and executed by campers. At the end of July, there is a dramatic or musical production, involving the entire camp community. Each Saturday evening, there is a large campfire, at which campers discuss their different countries and cultures, about global issues, prejudice and hate and hear presentations, sometimes by outside lecturers.

There is also time available each day for campers to pursue their own activity, be it sports, the arts, reading, an educational pursuit, swimming in the pool or just talking with other campers. Campers are encouraged to keep a journal and prepare other written material that is kept on file and sent to the camper at his or her twenty-first birthday.

A camper's journal from 2006 offers a glimpse of a typical day at Camp Rising Sun.

Seeking a Path to Sustainability  
Because of the worldwide financial crisis that began in 2007, there was no camp program held in 2009 in the United States and the European program was cancelled for 2010. Since then, the two campuses in upstate New York have resumed summer programs and the organization has undertaken a new strategic plan to ensure the Camp Rising Sun legacy.

On September 10, 2014, the LAJF Board outlined its view on financial challenges facing the organization, including the need for a $10 million increase in its endowment in order to meet current and future needs. The LAJF Board made available on the website a presentation from a summit in September 2014, which provided additional details on LAJF’s financial condition and the Board’s views on potential options for the organization. On October 3, 2014, it was announced that as part of its “New Dawn for Rising Sun” program, that the board had unanimously voted to put up for sale both the Red Hook and Clinton campuses, and to begin the process of securing a new site for an undisclosed new program(s) in order to improve the fiscal health of the organization. In addition to the sale of the two campuses, the LAJF Board announced that the 2015 camp season would consist of two 4 week sessions each for the boys and girls, both of which were to take place at the Clinton campus. The LAJF Board also announced a new $4 million fund raising campaign.

This change in direction from the LAJF Board of Directors led some alumni to voice their concerns. Some alumni organized a group and began a petition, supported by over 400 alumni, seeking to have the current Board reconsider its planned actions and admit that alumni were not given ample opportunity to weigh in on this decision.

On October 20, 2014, the LAJF Board announced that the sale of the Red Hook campus was to be postponed for six months and that they would seek to be better engaged with CRS alumni, including providing for electronic Town Hall meetings and other increased communications on its New Dawn plan.

In mid 2015, after extensive meetings by the Board's Strategic Planning, Building & Grounds and Finance Committees, the LAJF Board agreed to consider the reopening of the Red Hook campus provided certain funds were raised by the alumni, $550,000 of which was needed to be raised by early September, to gain a "formal" commitment to do so.  In  record time, over 300 individual contributors responded to this call, and the Board declared the first hurdle for reopening Red Hook a success.  Subsequent to this successful fundraise LAJF commissioned a survey of the Red Hook sewer system, which concluded that needed septic system repairs would far exceed the $550,000 raised by the alumni.
Since 2015, Camp Rising Sun has successfully run their summer program from the Clinton campus alternating Boys and Girls sessions. Due to the COVID 19 pandemic camp went virtual for 2020 and 2021.

CRS alumni
CRS campers become members of an international alumni group that are supportive of their evolving interests in college and careers. The LAJF Web site has a College Roster that connects young alumni with older alumni who are attending or have attended a broad range of colleges, universities and professional schools. Many alumni later spoke of their experiences at CRS, such as when writing their college essays. LAJF also supports a college scholarship program. While the Rising Sun experience is measured in weeks, the effects of the experience continue to develop and to play out over decades.

Alumni organizations for CRS alumni have been created internationally.

Notable alumni

Clifford Alexander, Jr., 1947, former foreign affairs officer on the National Security Council and the first African American  U.S. Secretary of the Army
Darren Aronofsky, filmmaker
Eli Attie, writer, television producer, former aide/speechwriter for Al Gore and Bill Clinton
Norberto Barba, filmmaker
David Botstein, biologist and recipient of the Albany Medical Center Prize and the Breakthrough Prize in Life Sciences
Francis F. Chen, 1944, plasma physicist, pioneer of ultra-cold physics
Samuel R. Delany, 1957, author, professor, literary critic, member of the Science Fiction and Fantasy Hall of Fame
Dick Dolman, 1951, former president, Dutch parliament
Sandi Simcha Dubowski, 1985 and 1986, filmmaker
Richard Gibbs, 1959, doctor, co-founder of the San Francisco free clinic, dancer with Hamburg Ballet and the Royal Winnipeg Ballet
Greg Giraldo, comedian
Naomi Gleit, Vice President of Product Management for Social Good at Facebook
Ulric Haynes, 1947, former U.S. ambassador to Algeria
Juliane Henningsen, 2001, Greenlandic politician
Anselm Hollo, 1950, Finnish writer
Robin Janvrin, Baron Janvrin, 1962, private secretary to the Queen of the United Kingdom
Robert Jastrow, chief of theoretical division of NASA; founder, Goddard Institute for Space Studies; author 
Ji Chaozhu, 1944, former Chinese ambassador to Britain, former Under-Secretary-General of the United Nations, author
Ashok Kamte, Mumbai police commissioner killed in the November 2008 Mumbai terror attacks
Kai Lee, program officer of science for the Conservation and Science Program of the Packard Foundation
Sidney Lumet, filmmaker
Michael Lunn, 1960, former Danish Minister of Justice, former Minister of Climate and Energy
Joshua Muravchik, 1962, scholar, American Enterprise Institute; public policy analyst
Matthew Nimetz, American diplomat and Under Secretary of State for Arms Control and International Security Affairs during the Jimmy Carter Administration
Frank Ochberg, psychiatrist, expert in post-traumatic stress disorder
Jeff Orlowski, 1999, 2000, 2002, 2006, documentary filmmaker
Michael Pressman, 1964, television director and producer
Itamar Rabinovich, 1959, former Israeli Ambassador to the United States; President of Tel Aviv University
Neil Leon Rudenstine, president emeritus, Harvard University
Pete Seeger, folk singer, songwriter
Raymond Wagner, 1937, 1939, film producer, former head of television pilot development Universal Studios, former VP of Production MGM, former head of television commercials Young & Rubicam, New York and Hollywood
James Yannatos, 1943, conductor, San Antonio Symphony; professor of music, Harvard University
Michelle Ye, 1995, actress
Zvi Zeitlin, 1935, concert violinist; Distinguished Professor of Music, Eastman School of Music, University of Rochester

See also

 Democratic school
 Experiment in International Living
 Summer camp

References

External links

 Camp Rising Sun, The Louis August Jonas Foundation
 George E. Jonas Foundation
 Camp Rising Sun Alumni Association of Finland

Scholarships in the United States
1929 establishments in New York (state)
Rising Sun
Red Hook, New York
Livingston family residences